"Virginal" is the debut single by Shouta Aoi, released on January 15, 2014. The song served as the ending theme song to the show Break Out for the month of January 2014.

Background and release

"Virginal" is Shouta Aoi's first single released under his current stage name. The song was used as the ending theme to the show Break Out for the month of January 2014.

The single was released on January 15, 2014 under the B-green label, along with the B-side "Yume no Tsuzuki." Along with the regular edition, a limited edition version of the single was released with an alternate cover and a DVD exclusive containing the music video for "Virginal."

Reception
"Virginal" reached #8 on the Oricon Weekly Singles Chart and charted for 4 weeks. The song also debuted at #22 on the Billboard Japan Hot 100.

Track listing

Charts

Notes

References

2014 singles
2014 songs
Japanese-language songs
Television drama theme songs